Joseph Frank DeLuca (June 6, 1932 – July 21, 2013) was an American gridiron football player and coach. He played professionally for the BC Lions in 1955. DeLuca played college football at the University of Montana. He served as the head football coach at Saint Mary's College of California from 1984 to 1985, compiling a record of 8–14.

Head coaching record

References

1932 births
2013 deaths
American football guards
Canadian football guards
American players of Canadian football
BC Lions players
Long Beach State 49ers football coaches
Montana Grizzlies football players
Saint Mary's Gaels football coaches
San Jose State Spartans football coaches
Junior college football coaches in the United States
People from Weed, California
Coaches of American football from California
Players of American football from California